Old No. 1 is the highly influential 1975 debut album by Texas singer-songwriter Guy Clark.

The cover of the original LP featured a painting by Susanna Clark and liner notes by Jerry Jeff Walker. It was reissued on CD by Sugar Hill. Both Old No. 1 and Texas Cookin' were re-issued on CD on the Camden label in 2001.

Track listing
All songs written by Guy Clark.

Side one

 "Rita Ballou" – 2:49
 "L.A. Freeway" – 4:43
 "She Ain't Goin' Nowhere" – 3:27
 "A Nickel for the Fiddler" – 2:45
 "That Old Time Feeling" – 4:10

Side two

 "Texas – 1947" – 3:10
 "Desperados Waiting for a Train" – 4:31
 "Like a Coat from the Cold" – 3:18
 "Instant Coffee Blues" – 3:15
 "Let Him Roll" – 4:05

Personnel
Guy Clark – vocals, guitar
Mike Leach – bass
Jerry Kroon – drums
Larrie Londin – drums
Chip Young – guitar
Pat Carter – guitar, background vocals
Steve Gibson – guitar
Jerry Carrigan – drums
 Dick Feller – guitar
Jim Colvard – guitar
Reggie Young – guitar
Hal Rugg – dobro, pedal steel
Jack Hicks – dobro
David Briggs – piano, background vocals
Chuck Cochran – piano
Shane Keister – piano
Johnny Gimble –  fiddle
Mickey Raphael – harmonica
Lea Jane Berinati – background vocals, piano
Rodney Crowell – background vocals
Emmylou Harris – background vocals
Gary B. White – background vocals
Florence Warner – background vocals
Steve Earle – background vocals
Sammi Smith – background vocals

Production notes
Neil Wilburn – producer, remixing
Paul Brookside – liner notes
Ray Butts – engineer
Pat Carter – associate producer
Susanna Clark – paintings
Gary Hobish – reissue mastering
Nathaniel Russell – reissue art director and design
Filippo Salvadori – reissue producer

Chart positions

References

External links
LP Discography web site.

1975 debut albums
Guy Clark albums
RCA Records albums
Sugar Hill Records albums